Transmembrane protein 126A is a mitochondrial transmembrane protein of unknown function coded for by the TMEM126A gene.

A nonsense mutation in the TMEM126A gene has been shown to be related to optic atrophy.  TMEM126A shows higher levels of expression in the parathyroid gland as well as in the peripheral blood cells of Huntington's disease patients, indicating that expression of this protein has some relation to blood regulation.

TMEM126A has two isoforms and is found on the long arm of Chromosome 11 in region 1, band 4, sub-band 1.  It is produced by the TMEM126 gene, which codes for a mRNA 726 base pairs long. which translates into a protein 195 amino acids long.  In addition, this gene is expressed 1.8 times the average of a normal gene and has expression with the prostate, uterus, kidney, placenta, heart, brain, and a large number of other tissues.

Gene

Locus

TMEM126 is located on the long arm of chromosome 11 in humans.  It is found on the first sub-band of the fourth band within the first region.  This can be written as 11q14.1.

Aliases
TMEM126A is also known as OPA7 and DKFZp586c1924.

Homology/evolutionary history 

TMEM126A has been highly conserved among mammals, never dropping below 60% sequence identity when aligned with the same protein sequence from other species.  It has been less well conserved outside of mammals, although it is evident in both fish, birds, and some invertebrates.

Orthologs

Paralogs 

TMEM126A has a single paralog: TMEM126B.  It is also found at 11q14.1 and is also known as HT007.  TMEM126B shares 36% sequence identity and 49% sequence similarity with TMEM126A. The central domain is conserved between TMEM126A and TMEM126B.

mRNA

Promoter Analysis
Promoter sequence:

TTCACCCAACACTGCTTCCAAATAAGCAGTACTCTGGAGAACACGAGAAATCCTCAGAAAAATAAGCTGCAGCTCTGAGG

TGCTGATTATGGTAGGGCAATCAATACAGATCAAAACATGGCACAGGGAGCTTAAGTTCCTAGGGAGAGTAGAAAATCGA

TAGAGCCAAGAAATAGCTCACCTTTGACTTATTTTTAACCTGAGTAGCTATCATATGCCAAGAGCTGTGCAGTTTTCATT

TACCCCATGCCAAGAACGTAAGTAGGCTCTACTGACCAGGAAGTTAAGTAATATGCCCGAGGTACGTTTTCAATGGAAGA

GGCTGACTGAGGGTCACCCAACTTATATCTCGAAATTTCACAATTTCTACAAGTTCTGTCCTGGGAGGCAAGAGTAGGTG

AAACGAGCACACTCTACGCCAGGCAAACAAACCTCAACGCTTAGCCTCCCGGCACCTCCTAGGGCCGGAAGCTTCTCAGC

CCAAAGCCGCTGCTGGCTGCAACCTCCGTCCCGCAGTCCAATTAGCAGCCGCGACCCGGCGCCCGCCCACGCCGCGTCAC

GAGTCAGCCAAAGATGGCTGCGCCCAGGTAATTTGAGCAAAGGCCACAGTGAACTCCGGCGTGGCTGAGGAAGGAGGAGG

CACCCACAGGCTGCTGGGAGGAGAGCATAAGGTACTGGTATTCCGGGGGAGGGGGTGAAGTAAATGTCCCGGTGTCAGGA

GAAGCACGACGCGG

	There was only one promoter sequence found by using ElDorado on Genomatix.  It is 734 base pairs long and found far upstream of the coding region of TMEM126A.  The promoter sequence experiences extremely high levels of expression among primates but could not be found in any other species.

mRNA Folding
The minimum free energy formation has a number of hairpin loops and bulges.  Another formation exists with a much larger bulge but which maintains the same hairpin loops.

TMEM126A has a number of likely locations for the formation of hairpin loops, four of which are extremely likely.

Alternative Splicing

In some circumstances, the second exon of the TMEM126A mRNA can be spliced out.  This exon contains the main starting codon for the gene.  The loss of this region would delay the start of translation until the next methionine, which occurs later in exon 3.  Ultimately, this causes a loss of a great deal of genetic information from exons 2 and three.

Protein

Isoforms 

The protein has three isoforms (a,b and c).  The first isoform is the main version and the longest while the other two are both shorter.

Secondary structure 

TMEM126A has a mixture of alpha helices, beta strands and coils that make up its secondary structure.  There are two regions of high alpha-helix density which correspond to the transmembrane regions of the protein.

Domains and motifs 

TMEM126A contains four exons, two transmembrane regions, and three stem-loop capable regions.

Post-translational modifications 

A peptide interaction can be found at amino acid 82 and continues to amino acid 90.  This regions has good solubility, thanks to the presence of both cysteine and valine, is not conserved in rabbits, which allows for antibody production, and demonstrates high hydrophobicity.

In addition, there are two glycosylation sites at amino acids 13 and 60. as well as one phosphorylation site at amino acid 40

Expression 

TMEM126A is expressed ubiquitously throughout the human body at 1.8 times the normal expression level for human genes.  It experiences especially high expression in the parathyroid gland.  In addition, TMEM126A experiences higher levels of expression in peripheral blood cells in patients diagnosed with Huntington's disease as well as individuals who experience ocular dominance.

Interacting proteins 

TMEM126A interacts with a number of proteins.  MYC and MAX form a complex and promote transcription. There is interaction with ATP synthase and the optic atrophy protein.  These interactions relate to the proteins function in the mitochondria as well as its medical applications.

Clinical significance 

A nonsense mutation in the TMEM126A gene has been shown to be related to optic atrophy.  This mutation occurs on the second exon of the protein.  The mutation results in decreased expression of TMEM126A.  It has been demonstrated that a mutated TMEM126A gene can be distinguished from a normal gene through the use of antibodies which recognize the differences between the two.  Experiments have shown that it associates with CD137L in myeloid cells.

Model organisms 

Model organisms have been used in the study of TMEM126A function. A conditional knockout mouse line called Tmem126atm1a(EUCOMM)Wtsi was generated at the Wellcome Trust Sanger Institute. Male and female animals underwent a standardized phenotypic screen to determine the effects of deletion. Additional screens performed:  - In-depth immunological phenotyping

References